= Mainstream rock =

Radio format

Mainstream rock (also known as heritage rock) is a radio format used by many commercial radio stations in the United States and Canada.

== Format background ==
Mainstream rock stations represent a cross between classic rock, active rock and alternative rock on the programming spectrum, in that they play more classic rock songs from the 1970s and 1980s and fewer songs from emerging acts than active rock and alternative rock stations, and only rarely play songs on the softer edge of the classic rock format or the harder edge of the active rock format. They program a balanced airplay of tracks found on active rock, alternative rock and classic rock playlists, but the music playlist tends to focus on charting hard rock music from the 1970s through the 2000s.

Mainstream rock is the true successor to the widespread album-oriented rock (AOR) format created in the 1970s. However, mainstream rock can be used as a modernized update of classic rock if any radio station playlist has to cut back on some active rock artists and songs due to ratings and popularity demand, which is an absolute variable in each local market by each state and each franchised or locally owned radio company operation. To this day, there are a select few mainstream rock programmed stations that will purposely play any new rock artist while keeping the classics involved, which sits on a borderline scale being influenced by active rock strongly. Meanwhile, some stations consist of playing all 40 years worth of rock hits, ranging from classic hard rock and hair metal artists all the way to 2000s hard rock and metal artists, the format is an open variable.

Acts that receive heavy airplay on classic rock stations, including the Beatles, Elton John, Fleetwood Mac, Eagles, or Supertramp receive some airplay on mainstream rock stations, albeit less frequently than acts like Green Day, Nirvana, Pearl Jam, Foo Fighters, Red Hot Chili Peppers, or Alice in Chains. Classic hard rock artists of the mid to late 1970s to the late 1980s as well as all of the 1990s alternative and grunge artists completely highlight what mainstream rock is. It is less common to hear many newer rock artists.

Mainstream rock has evolved into a sequel for the classic rock radio format. It has begun to remove hard rock and metal artists that are from the early 2000s as well as the 2010s on some rock radio stations, to avoid overlapping into the active rock format. This is a following trend since almost all classic rock stations rarely play harder songs and artists within their format.

Outside the United States and Canada, mainstream rock refers generally to rock music deemed "radio friendly". It very rarely is referred to as a specific radio format.
